Juan Carlos Mortensen (born April 13, 1972, in Ambato, Ecuador) is an Ecuadorian professional poker player of Danish descent and the first South American Main Event winner of the World Series of Poker. Mortensen is known for his loose play, bluffing tactics, and interesting chip-stacking style.

Poker career

World Series of Poker 
Mortensen moved from Spain to the United States in the late 1990s to play poker. He won $1,500,000 at the 2001 World Series of Poker (WSOP) Main Event.  He defeated a then-record field of 613 players, including a very tough final table that included professional players Mike Matusow (6th), 1989 WSOP Main Event champion Phil Hellmuth (5th), Phil Gordon (4th), and Dewey Tomko (2nd). In the final hand, Mortensen's  out-drew and defeated Tomko's , when Mortensen's hand improved to make a straight.

Mortensen won his second career bracelet at the 2003 World Series of Poker in the $5,000 Limit Hold'em event, earning $251,680.  He defeated professional player Mark Gregorich heads-up to win the title.

At the 2006 World Series of Poker, Carlos made three final tables. He finished in ninth place in Event #2 (No Limit Hold'em) winning $71,617. He would once again finish in ninth place in Event #6 (NL Hold 'em) earning him another $73,344. He came up just short of winning his third bracelet in Event #33 (Razz), where he finished runner-up to fellow professional James Richburg earning him $94,908.

Mortensen finished in 10th place in the 2013 WSOP Main Event, being the "Final Table Bubble Boy."

Mortensen was considered to be the last big-name poker professional to win the Main Event at the World Series of Poker, until Koray Aldemir in 2021. As a result of the poker boom, which ignited itself two years after his win, when Chris Moneymaker won the Main Event, the fields in that tournament have increased exponentially making it extraordinarily more difficult for individual players to maintain consistent success in it. A few other big-name players have made the final table in the post-boom years since his victory, but none of them have managed as of 2017 to win the Main Event.

World Series of Poker bracelets

World Poker Tour 

In 2004, he won the World Poker Tour (WPT) Doyle Brunson North American Poker Championship for $1,000,000. Mortensen won the Season Five World Poker Tour championship event for a $3,970,415 first place prize, his largest tournament cash to date, and his second career WPT title, making him the first player in professional poker history to ever win the World Championship events at both the World Series of Poker and the World Poker Tour.

In 2010, Mortensen won the Season Eight WPT Hollywood Poker Open. With this win, he passed fellow professional Daniel Negreanu for first place on the all-time WPT money list, and tied Gus Hansen for most WPT titles with three.

Other poker tournaments 
Mortensen has made the prize money in the World Heads-Up Poker Championship, and was a semi-finalist in the second season of the Poker Superstars Invitational Tournament.

Mortensen had a good run at the 2007 European Poker Tour Main Event in Monte Carlo finishing 11th, going out to Joshua Prager after making a straight on the turn, but defeated by a flush on the river.

In 2006, he and his wife, fellow poker player Cecilia Reyes Mortensen, divorced.

As of August 2017, his total live tournament winnings exceed $12,100,000. His 21 cashes as the WSOP account for over $3,200,000 of those winnings.

References in Pop Culture 
Mortensen is mentioned fictitiously in the hit US television show Gossip Girl, during Season 3 Episode 6 "Enough About Eve". In the episode Mortensen is referred to as Lily Humphrey's former lover with whom she spent a Summer in Monte Carlo. It is also mentioned in the Episode that Serena, Lily's daughter, was taught to play Poker by Carlos using Necco Wafers as chips.

References

External links
 GENEALOGY, family origins of Carlos Mortensen in the Mauricio Alvarado-Dávila's genealogical database for Ecuador.
 World Poker Tour – profile
 Hendon Mob tournament results

1972 births
Living people
Ecuadorian people of Danish descent
Ecuadorian poker players
World Poker Tour winners
World Series of Poker bracelet winners
World Series of Poker Main Event winners
Poker Hall of Fame inductees